Lorenç Vorfi (born 24 January 1941) is an Albanian footballer. He played in five matches for the Albania national football team from 1963 to 1967.

References

1941 births
Living people
Albanian footballers
Albania international footballers
Place of birth missing (living people)
Association footballers not categorized by position